Village at Full Moon (Czech: Vesnice za úplňku) is a tempera on panel painting by Flemish painter Joos de Momper. The oeuvre was painted in the early 17th century, possibly in the 1620s, and is currently housed at the National Gallery in Prague.

Painting
The painting offers a view of a Flemish village under a full moon. The moon is shining on the town from an open spot in the cloudy sky. In the foreground, two horsemen trot their horses towards a bridge on the bottom right, which a family of three is crossing. A monk is feeding his donkey on the bottom left, while two other barefooted and bearded men talk closely to each other to his right. In this painting, Momper regulated the light so as to illuminate the scene from two points and different sources. From the right there pours in moonlight, while a fiery glow radiates on the other side.

The figures in the painting might have been realized by Jan Brueghel the Elder, a frequent collaborator of de Momper.

References

Further reading

External links
Description of the painting and high quality picture thereof at the National Gallery of Prague
Painting at the Web Gallery of Art

16th-century paintings
17th-century paintings
Landscape paintings
Paintings by Joos de Momper
Paintings in the collection of the National Gallery Prague